Keesean Ferdinand (born 17 August 2003) is a Canadian professional soccer player who plays as a defender for MLS Next Pro side Portland Timbers 2.

Early life
Ferdinand began playing youth soccer in 2007, at age four, with CS Rivière-des-Prairies, who he played with until 2013. He then played for CS Panellinios. In 2014, he joined the Montreal Impact Academy, initially starting in the pre-academy program.

Club career
On 17 June 2020, he became the youngest player to sign professionally with the Montreal Impact, at the age of 16, as well as the first player to progress through Montreal's pre-academy system to sign with the first team, signing a two-year contract with a club option for 2022. He first appeared on a match-day squad with Montreal in a CONCACAF Champions League match against Honduran club CD Olimpia on December 16, 2020, but was an unused substitute.

In February 2021, Ferdinand went on loan to Canadian Premier League side Atlético Ottawa. With Ottawa, he had the opportunity to train with players from the Atlético Madrid academy and play exhibition games against youth teams from La Liga clubs and Spanish fourth division teams, during Ottawa's pre-season. Upon completion of the 2021 MLS season, CF Montréal would announce that they would exercise the option on Ferdinand's contract for 2022. In 2022, he went on loan with the second team, CF Montréal U23, in the Première ligue de soccer du Québec. After the 2022 season, his option was declined and he departed the club.

In March 2023, he signed with Portland Timbers 2 in MLS Next Pro.

International career
Ferdinand is eligible to represent Canada and Haiti, where his mother was born.

In March 2019, he debuted in the Canadian youth system, attending a camp with the Canadian U17 team. He was then named to the roster for the 2019 FIFA U-17 World Cup.

In June 2022, Ferdinand was named to the Canadian U20 team for the 2022 CONCACAF U-20 Championship.

References

Notes

External links

2003 births
Living people
Association football defenders
Canadian soccer players
Soccer players from Montreal
People from Rivière-des-Prairies–Pointe-aux-Trembles
Canadian sportspeople of Haitian descent
CF Montréal players
Atlético Ottawa players
Canadian Premier League players
Homegrown Players (MLS)
Canada men's youth international soccer players
Montreal Impact U23 players
Première ligue de soccer du Québec players
Portland Timbers 2 players